Pathayeram Kodi is a 2013 Tamil-language science fiction comedy film written and directed by Muktha S. Sundar. The film stars Vivek, Dhruv Bhandari, Madalsa Sharma and Kanishka Soni. The film was dubbed and released in Hindi as Paisa Ho Paisa in 2015.

Synopsis

A group of college students invent a chemical potion that makes them invisible. They use this invention to steal  from Karishma (Kanishka Soni), who has an abundance of illegal wealth. Shankar Lal (Vivek), a CB-CID officer, must trace the money from the students, who are on the run.

Cast

 Vivek as Shankar Lal
 Dhruv Bhandari as Ashwin
 Madalsa Sharma as Bhoomika
 Kanishka Soni as Karishma
 Gokulnath as Gokul
 Cell Murugan as Shankar Lal's assistant
 Madhan Bob as Police officer

Production
The film has been shot across 7 Indian states including Maharashtra, Tamil Nadu, Goa. The climax of the movie has been shot inside Sani Singhnapur Temple. Besides it has also been shot in the exotic locations of Karwar, Goa, Mercara, Pune, Ahmednagar, Mahabaleshwar and Panchagani.

Soundtrack 
The songs are composed by K. S. Manoj and G. D. Prasad.
‘Ithu Enna Mayamo’, written by Nishanth and sung by Vinay and Raina
 ‘Bhumika’ written by Nishanth and sung by Haricharan
 ‘Azhagana Poigal’ written by Nishanth and sung by Prasanna and Harini
  ‘Padikka Padikka’ written by Sivakasi Sridar and sung by Vinay, Barath and M.J.Deekshith
‘C.B.I.Singam’ written by Sivakasi Sridar and sung by Sunanthitha and Kalyan
 ‘Pathayiramkodi’ written by Sivakasi Sridar and sung by Nathamuni Gayathri

References

External links
 Paisa Ho Paisa On Bollywood Hungama
 

2013 films
2010s Tamil-language films
Indian heist films
Films about invisibility
Indian science fiction comedy films
2010s science fiction comedy films
Fictional portrayals of the Tamil Nadu Police
2013 comedy films